Potosi Mountain may refer to:

 Cerro Rico ("Rich Mountain") in Bolivia, also known as Potosi Mountain
 A mountain of the Potosí mountain range in Bolivia
 Huayna Potosí, Bolivia
 Potosi Mountain (Nevada)
 Wayna Potosí (Oruro), Bolivia

See also
 Potosi (disambiguation)